The Dallas Legion, formerly the Dallas Roughnecks are a professional ultimate team that competes in the South Division of the American Ultimate Disc League (AUDL). Founded in 2015, the team played their first year in the 2016 AUDL season, wherein they won the championship title.

History 
In June 2014, it was reported that American Ultimate Disc League franchise rights had been sold for Dallas, which would come to the league in 2016. Over a year later, it was revealed that Ultimate insider Jim Gerencser had bought the rights and named the team the Roughnecks. Gerencser proceeded to build one of the best expansion teams in AUDL history, including signing Beau Kittredge from the established San Jose Spiders. The Roughnecks won the AUDL championship in their first year, completing a perfect season.

The Roughnecks were knocked out of the 2017 AUDL playoffs during the semifinal game against the Toronto Rush.

In the Roughnecks' third season, they won the South Division and once again advanced to the championship game. Unfortunately, they lost to the Madison Radicals in Madison. They experienced a similar scenario in 2019, eliminating the San Diego Growlers in the semifinal before falling to the New York Empire in the championship game with a total score of 22-26.

In 2021 the Roughnecks finished 2nd in the West Division at 8-4 and lost to the San Diego Growlers in the first round. In December 2021, the Roughnecks announced that they were rebranding as the Dallas Legion.

Record

References 

Ultimate (sport) teams
Sports in Dallas
2015 establishments in Texas
Ultimate teams established in 2015